Röntgen or Roentgen may refer to:

 Roentgen (unit), unit of measurement for ionizing radiation, named after Wilhelm Röntgen
 Wilhelm Röntgen (1845–1923), German physicist, discoverer of X-rays
 Abraham Roentgen (1711–1793), German cabinetmaker
 David Roentgen (1743–1807), German cabinetmaker, son of Abraham Roentgen
 Gerhard Moritz Roentgen (1795-1852), Dutch and German entrepreneur and engineer
 Engelbert Röntgen (1829–1897), German-Dutch violinist
 Heinrich Röntgen (1787–1813), German explorer
 Julius Röntgen (1855–1932), German-Dutch composer of classical music, son of Engelbert Röntgen
 Kevin Roentgen, musician, singer with American rock band Orson
 Roentgen (album), by Japanese singer Hyde

See also
 Röntgen rays, alternative name for X-rays
 Roentgenium, chemical element, Atomic Number 111 (previously unununium)
Astronomical Roentgen Telescope